Barksdale may refer to:

Places
Barksdale, Mississippi, an unincorporated community
Barksdale, Texas, an unincorporated community
Barksdale, Wisconsin, a town
Barksdale (community), Wisconsin, an unincorporated community
Barksdale Air Force Base

People with the surname
Alfred D. Barksdale (1892–1972), American soldier, Virginia lawyer, legislator and judge
David Barksdale (1947–1974), American gang leader from Chicago
Don Barksdale (1923–1993), American professional basketball player
Ethelbert Barksdale  (1824–1893), Confederate congressman, author of a bill to arm slaves, and later US Congressman
Eugene Hoy Barksdale (1896–1926), American aviator
James L. Barksdale (born 1943), investment fund manager, U.S. Senate candidate in Georgia (2016)
Lance Barksdale (born 1967),  Major League Baseball umpire 
Mary Barksdale (1920–1992), African-American nurse, businesswoman, and civil rights activist
Nathan Barksdale (1961-2016), a West Baltimore drug dealer and a subject of the documentary Baltimore Chronicles Legends of the Unwired
Rhesa Barksdale (born 1944), Senior United States Circuit Judge 
William Barksdale (1821–1863), American lawyer, politician, and Confederate general

Fictional entities
Amy Barksdale, a character in the animated series Daria
Rita Barksdale, a character in the animated series Daria
Barksdale Organization, a fictional drug dealing gang on the television series The Wire
Avon Barksdale, a character in  The Wire played by Wood Harris
Brianna Barksdale, a character in  The Wire played by Charlene "Michael" Hyatt
D'Angelo Barksdale, a character in  The Wire played by Larry Gilliard, Jr. 
Tyrell Barksdale, D'Angelo and Donette's son in The Wire